Wadakapiapué-tepui, also spelled Wadakapiapö, Wadakapiapo, Wadaka Piapo or Guadacapiapui, is a tepui of the Eastern Tepuis chain in Bolívar, Venezuela. It lies just west of the much larger Yuruaní-tepui.

See also
 Distribution of Heliamphora

References

Tepuis of Venezuela
Mountains of Venezuela
Mountains of Bolívar (state)